The Campbell-Johnston Collection is a collection of poster stamps that forms part of the British Library Philatelic Collections. It consists of 30 large green albums.

References

Further reading 
Schmidt, Walter., ed. "The Poster Stamp Report" in The Cinderella Philatelist, Journal of The Cinderella Stamp Club. 
Steele, H. Thomas. Lick 'em, Stick 'em; the Lost Art of Poster Stamps. New York: Abbeville Press, 1989.

External links
Cinderellas - Poster Stamps article.
World Poster Stamps by Charles Kiddle.

British Library Philatelic Collections
Cinderella stamps